552 Squadron "Zangões" (Esquadra 552) is a transport helicopter squadron of the Portuguese Air Force (PoAF). Its based at Air Base No. 11 (BA11), at Beja, and operates the AgustaWestland AW119 in transport and helicopter instruction roles.

Mission 
It has the primary mission of executing tactical air transport operations and the secondary missions of providing basic and complementary flying training in helicopters, providing combat air support, executing general air transport operations and executing search and rescue operations.

In addition to providing helicopter instruction for the Air Force, the squadron also has trained pilots of the Navy's helicopter squadron and pilots and ground crews of the Army's UALE.

History 
Created on 24 November 1978, the 552 Squadron has inherited the traditions of all former Portuguese Air Force squadrons that operated the Sud Aviation Alouette III.

After the Carnation Revolution a major reorganization occurred in the Portuguese Armed Forces with many helicopters squadrons returning from the oversea colonies and being assigned to 33 Squadron based at Air Base No. 3 (BA3) and to the Helicopter Group of Air Base No. 6 (BA6). In 1978 another reorganization in the Air Force lead to the renaming of the 301 Operational Group to 301 Operational Group, with the new formed 111 Squadron – dedicated to Aviocar and Alouette III training – and 552 Squadron, and the 61 Operational Group (GO61), with the 551 Squadron (Alouette III) and 751 Squadron (Sud Aviation Puma).

Upon its creation 552 Squadron's primary missions was tactical air transport, airborne operations, medical evacuation, special operations, and logistic air support, as well the secondary missions of general air transport and offensive operations of close air support. In 1982, the Rotores de Portugal helicopter flight demonstration team was reactivated in 552 Sqn. with two helicopters, having the team been originally integrated in 33 Squadron when created in April 1976. During the early 1990s the team was integrated with 111 Sqn., operating three helicopters.

With the disbandment of 551 Squadron in October 1986, all personnel and helicopters of that squadron are transferred to the 552 Squadron, which also receives from that squadron the secondary mission of search and rescue (SAR). 552 Sqn. also inherited the SAR detachment then maintained by 551 Sqn. at Maneuvers Airfield No. 2 (AM2; former Air Base No. 7, BA7), in Aveiro; this SAR detachment was later deployed to Maneuvers Airfield No. 1 (AM1) at Ovar. At this time PoAF had 26 operational helicopters.

On 18 November 1993, 552 Sqn. was moved to Air Base No. 11 (BA11), in Beja, due to the deactivation of BA3 on 29 December 1993.

In 2005, the Rotores de Portugal were reactivated in 552 Sqn. with three helicopters.

Lineage 
 Constituted as Esquadra 33 (33 Squadron) in 1970
 Disbanded in 1978
 Reformed as Esquadra de Transporte Táctico 552 (552 Tactical Transport Squadron) on 28 November 1978
 Re-designated: Esquadra 552 (552 Squadron) in October 1986

See also 
 Portuguese Air Force
 Portuguese Colonial War
 Rotores de Portugal
 Exercise Real Thaw

References

External links 
 Esquadra 552, official website

Portuguese Air Force aircraft squadrons
Military units and formations established in 1978
Military of Portugal